Shivling is a mountain at tapovan in the Gangotri Group of peaks in the western Garhwal Himalaya, near the snout of the Gangotri Glacier, one of the biggest glaciers in the Himalayas, and Tapovan, a beautiful lush meadows, both being also popular pilgrimage sites in Hinduism. Its name refers to its status as a sacred symbol -Shiva Linga. It was called "Matterhorn Peak" by early European visitors because of its similarity in appearance to that Alpine peak. While not of locally great elevation, it is a dramatic rock peak, and the most visually striking peak as seen from Gaumukh; that and the difficulty of the climb make it a famed prize for mountaineers.

The mountain and its setting
Shivling forms the western gateway for the lower Gangotri Glacier, opposite the triple-peaked Bhagirathi massif. It lies on a spur projecting out from the main ridge that forms the southwest side of the Gangotri Glacier basin; this ridge contains other well-known peaks such as Bhagirathi, Thalay Sagar and Meru.

It was also called Mahadeo Ka Linga or (Mahadev Ka Linga)
Appearing as a single pyramid when seen from Gaumukh, Shivling is actually a twin-summitted mountain, with the northeast summit being slightly higher than the southwest summit, . Between Gaumukh and Shivling lies the Tapovan meadow, a popular pilgrimage site due to its inspiring view of the mountain.

Shivling is well-defended on all sides by steep rock faces; only the west flank has a moderate enough slope for snow accumulation.

Climbing history

After British exploration of the Gangotri Glacier in 1933, a German expedition led by R. Schwarzgruber climbed nearby peaks and did a reconnaissance of Shivling in 1938. They reported "no feasible route" on the mountain due to its steepness and the threat of falling seracs.

Shivling was first climbed on 3 June 1974 via the west ridge, by a team from the Indo-Tibetan Border Police, led by Hukam Singh. The ridge is the lowest-angle feature on the mountain, but still involves serious mixed climbing, and is threatened by the serac barrier noted by the Germans. The ridge leads to the col between the two summits; a steep snow/ice ridge then leads to the main summit.

Since the first ascent, at least ten other routes have been climbed on the peak, ascending all  major ridges and most major faces of the mountain. All routes are extremely serious undertakings.

The North Pillar route was climbed in 1993 by Hans Kammerlander and Christoph Hainz.

In 2004 Shirshendu Mukherjee became the youngest person in the world to have climbed the mountain at the age of 19 as a part of an Indian expedition.

In 2005, Basanta Singha Roy and Debashis Biswas, both climbers from Mountaineers Association Of Krishnanagar (MAK), West Bengal, India, were the first successful  summiters of India, as a part of a civilian effort i.e. climbed by the help of a Sherpa guide with an expedition style..

On 25 May 2012, Valery Rozov made the first BASE jump from the summit of Shivling at an altitude of  wearing a wingsuit.

References

Geography of Uttarkashi district
Mountains of Uttarakhand
Six-thousanders of the Himalayas